Udorn Duangdecha (born 18 October 1970) is a Thai professional golfer.

Udorn plays on the Asian Tour where he has won once - the 2010 King's Cup.

Professional wins (7)

Asian Tour wins (1)

All Thailand Golf Tour wins (5)
2010 Singha Pattaya Open1, B-Ing TPC Championships
2011 Singha E-San Open1
2016 All Thailand Premier Championship
2018 Singha Hua Hin Open
1Co-sanctioned by the ASEAN PGA Tour

ASEAN PGA Tour wins (2)

1Co-sanctioned by the All Thailand Golf Tour

Thailand PGA Tour wins (1)

Team appearances
World Cup (representing Thailand): 1995

References

External links

Udorn Duangdecha
Asian Tour golfers
1970 births
Living people
Udorn Duangdecha